György Kiss (1 May 1936 – 27 June 1987) was a Hungarian long-distance runner. He competed in the men's 5000 metres at the 1968 Summer Olympics.

References

1936 births
1987 deaths
Athletes (track and field) at the 1968 Summer Olympics
Hungarian male long-distance runners
Olympic athletes of Hungary
Place of birth missing
20th-century Hungarian people